James Francis Donnellan (17 November 1907 – 5 July 1994) was an Australian rules footballer who played with Hawthorn, North Melbourne and Fitzroy in the Victorian Football League (VFL).

Early life
The son of James Francis Donnellan and Margaret Ann Fitzgerald, Frank Donnellan was educated at Xavier College in Kew and was a prominent player in their 1924 premiership side.

Football

Having been released by Hawthorn at the commencement of the 1927 VFL season, Donnellan played with Thornbury in the C.Y.M.S. Association and then moved to North Melbourne and made a solitary appearance late in the season. During the next few years Donnellan did not play VFL football, again playing with Thornbury, but he resumed with North Melbourne halfway through the 1931 VFL season and made 17 consecutive appearances in the team. During this run of games he changed position from being a key forward to playing at full-back. 

At the start of the 1933 VFL season, Donnellan transferred to Fitzroy and he played as full-back in every game for the next two seasons before his retirement.

Later life
In 1935 Frank Donnellan married Jane Elizabeth O’Connell and they lived in Melbourne until his death in 1994. Donnellan is buried at the Andersons Creek Cemetery in Warrandyte.

Notes

External links 

1907 births
1994 deaths
Australian rules footballers from Melbourne
People educated at Xavier College
Hawthorn Football Club players
North Melbourne Football Club players
Fitzroy Football Club players
People from Clifton Hill, Victoria